Euchlaenidia neglecta is a moth of the family Erebidae. It was described by Rothschild in 1910. It is found in Brazil, particularly in the Santa Catarina region.

References

External links

Euchlaenidia
Moths described in 1910